Andy Lau Tak-wah  (born 27 September 1961) is a Hong Kong actor, singer-songwriter and film producer. He has been one of Hong Kong's most commercially successful film actors since the mid-1980s, performing in more than 160 films while maintaining a successful singing career at the same time. In the 1990s, Lau was branded by the media as one of the Four Heavenly Kings of Cantopop and was named as "Fourth Tiger" among the Five Tiger Generals of TVB during the 1980s. In the Philippines, he was previously given the screen name Ricky Chan.

By April 2000, Lau won an unprecedented total of 292 awards. He also holds numerous film acting awards, having won the Hong Kong Film Award for Best Actor three times and the Golden Horse Award for Best Leading Actor twice. In 2005, Lau received the "No.1 Box office Actor 1985–2005" award of Hong Kong, yielding a box office total of HK$1,733,275,816 for shooting 108 films in the past 20 years, and in 2007, he received the "Nielsen Box Office Star of Asia" award by the Nielsen Company (ACNielsen). On 25 June 2018, Lau was invited to be a member of the Academy of Motion Picture Arts and Sciences.

Early life 
Andy Lau was born in Tai Po, Hong Kong, a son of a fireman Lau Lai (劉禮). He was the fourth child of the family; he has three elder sisters, one younger sister, and a younger brother named Lau Tak-sing. His family was considered to be wealthy as his grandfather was a landowner, but his father left with him to the slums of Diamond Hill when he was six, where the area was full of wooden houses, and was burnt down when he was eleven. As a young boy, Lau had to fetch water for his family up to eight times a day because their house was not equipped with plumbing. He graduated from a Band One secondary school, Ho Lap College in San Po Kong, Kowloon. He was named as Lau Fook-wing (劉福榮) during his academic years. He also practices Chinese calligraphy. Lau converted to Buddhism in the 1980s. He was raised in a nominally Buddhist household and is now a follower of the Lingyan Mountain Temple in Taiwan.

Career

Actor 

In 1981, Lau signed up for the artist training program offered by TVB, which is where his acting career began. The lead role which led to his initial popularity was in the 1982 TVB series The Emissary. In 1983, Lau's role as Yang Guo in the TVB wuxia series The Return of the Condor Heroes (神鵰俠侶) further increased his popularity. From then on, he took on many of the lead roles in many TVB series.

In September 1983, TVB was looking to increase their ratings in competition with Korea and Japan for the best variety show. The station then created the show TVB All-star challenge (星光熠熠勁爭輝) featuring almost the entire line-up of the most popular actors and singers at the time. Lau, along with Tony Leung, Michael Miu, Felix Wong, and Kent Tong were branded as the "Five Tiger Generals of TVB" (無線五虎將) due to their popularity on the show.

In the late '80s, Lau left TVB due to contract problems. TVB wanted to bind him to an exclusive five-year contract which Lau refused to sign, so TVB blacklisted him. He then focused on his film career.

In 1981, Lau made a guest appearance in one of Susanna Kwan's music videos and caught the eye of the manager Teddy Robin. Teddy Robin then gave Lau a chance to play a small role in the film, Once Upon a Rainbow. This was the first step in Lau's film acting career. He landed a role in Ann Hui's 1982 film, Boat People. Later in 1983 he had his first leading role in the Shaw Brothers-produced action film, On the Wrong Track.

One of his early leading roles included the more serious 1988 film, The Truth (法內情). However, Lau is best known in films for his (often) recurring roles as a "Heroic Gangster", such as Wong Kar-wai's 1988 film As Tears Go By (旺角卡門) and Benny Chan's 1990 film A Moment of Romance.

Although now a respected actor, Lau was initially known more for his handsome features. Some people he has worked with have called him a matinee idol, but he has claimed to be an artist. Lau has proved his acting skills in many of his films. His first major acting prize came with A Fighter's Blues, which was his first Golden Bauhinia Award for Best Actor. He won the Hong Kong Film Award for Best Actor award that year for Running Out of Time. In 2004, he won the Golden Horse Award for Best Leading Actor for his performance in Infernal Affairs III, the second sequel to the popular Infernal Affairs.

In 2005, Lau received the "No.1 Box office Actor 1985–2005" award of Hong Kong, yielding a box office total of HKD 1,733,275,816 for shooting 108 films in the past 20 years. The aforementioned figure is as compared to the first runner-up Stephen Chow's (HKD 1,317,452,311) and second runner-up Jackie Chan's (HKD 894,090,962). "I've never imagined that it would be as much as 1.7 billion!" he told reporters. For his contributions, a wax figure of Lau was unveiled on 1 June 2005 at the Madame Tussauds Hong Kong. In 2007, Lau also received the "Nielsen Box Office Star of Asia" award by the Nielsen Company (ACNielsen).

In May 2014, he starred in China's first anti-trafficking film Lost and Love, playing a stubborn and kind-hearted farmer Lei Zekuan, which was released on 20 March 2015.

In April 2017, he starred in the Hong Kong police action film Shock Wave, which earned him another Best Actor Award at the 37th Hong Kong Film Awards in 2018.

In February 2021, Lau reunited with Tony Leung since the Infernal Affairs series in the big-budget action film Once Upon a Time in Hong Kong, backed by Emperor Motion Pictures and mainland Chinese partners, with a reported budget of around $30.8 million (RMB200 million).

Film producer 
In 1991, Lau set up his own film production company, Teamwork Motion Pictures, which in 2002 was renamed to Focus Group Holdings Limited. His contributions in the film industry as well as his involvement in nurturing new talent in the Asian film industry led him to winning the "Asian Filmmaker of the Year" award in the Pusan International Film Festival in 2006. Some of the films Lau has produced include award-winning films, Made in Hong Kong and A Simple Life, his 100th film, A Fighter's Blues, the Chinese digital film Crazy Stone, and big budget action blockbusters, Firestorm and Shock Wave.

Musical career 

Lau released his first album "Only Know that I Still Love You" (只知道此刻愛你) under Capital Artists in 1985. This album was not a big hit, but despite having a voice not traditionally associated with popular music, Lau's hard work and perseverance resulted in him becoming one of the most successful singers in Cantopop. His singing career reached stellar status in 1990 with the release of the album entitled "Would It Be Possible" (可不可以), and his subsequent releases only solidified his status as a marketable singer. For that song, he won his first 1990 RTHK Top 10 Gold Songs Awards. He then won at least one RTHK award category every year consecutively until the year 2007.

From Jade Solid Gold Top 10 Awards he has won the "Most Popular Hong Kong Male Artist" award 7 times and the "Asia Pacific Most Popular Hong Kong Male Artist" award 15 times. He was also entered into the Guinness World Records for "Most Awards Won by a Cantopop Male Artist". By April 2000, he had already won an unprecedented total of 292 awards.

Many of Lau's songs quickly topped the music charts not only in Hong Kong, but also in Taiwan, Mainland China, and in many different parts of Asia. Some of his most notable hits include "The Days We Spent Together" (一起走過的日子), "If You Are My Legend" (如果你是我的傳說), "The Tide" (潮水), "Forget Love Potion" (忘情水), "True Forever" (真永遠), "Chinese people" (中國人), "Love You Forever" (愛你一萬年), "You Are My Woman" (你是我的女人), and "Secret Admiration" (暗裡著迷). Besides singing in Cantonese and Mandarin, he has also sung in other languages such as English, Japanese, Malay, and Taiwanese Hokkien. One example of a Hokkien song was (世界第一等), and he has also performed a Cantonese cover of Joan Jett's "I Hate Myself for Loving You" (我恨我痴心).

Since the early 1990s, Lau, along with Jacky Cheung 張學友, Aaron Kwok 郭富城 and Leon Lai 黎明, have been referred to by the Chinese media as the Cantopop Four Heavenly Kings.

Lau sang alongside Jackie Chan during a part of the 2008 Summer Olympics closing ceremony on 24 August 2008. In addition, Lau, who has been supporting disabled athletes in Hong Kong for more than a decade, was appointed as the Goodwill ambassador for the 2008 Summer Paralympics. He led other performers in singing and performing the song "Everyone is No.1" at the Beijing National Stadium just a few hours before the 2008 Paralympics opening ceremony began. He also sang the theme song "Flying with the Dream" with Han Hong during the Paralympics opening ceremony on 6 September 2008.

As a songwriter, most of Lau's creative works are as a lyricist. To date, Lau has composed five songs, which include "Missing You Everyday" (天天想你), co-composed with Eric Moo, "If One Day" (如果有一天), "Happiness Is So Far... So Sweet" (幸福.這麼遠.那麼甜), "Spending the Rest Our Lives Together" (餘生一起過), all of which he also sang and wrote the lyrics, and "Brothers" (兄弟), the theme song of his 2004 film, Jiang Hu, which he wrote the lyrics for but was sung by co-star Chapman To. Most of the songs he has written have been for himself.

Books written 
To date, Lau has written and published two books. They include his 1995 autobiography, This Is How I Grew Up (我是這樣長大的) written in prose, and his 2012 book, My 30 Work Days (我的30個工作天), which is a collection of his 30 personal diaries he wrote while working on the 2011 film, A Simple Life.

Appearance in other media 
Lau is alleged to have been featured as a non-player character (NPC) as a random pedestrian in a sandbox-style action video game called Prototype.

Philanthropy 
In 1994, Lau established the Andy Lau Charity Foundation which helps people in need and promotes a wide range of youth education services. In 1999, he received the Ten Outstanding Young Persons of the World award, being the third person from Hong Kong at that time to receive this distinguished honour. In 2008, Lau took a main role in putting together the Artistes 512 Fund Raising Campaign for relief toward the victims of the 2008 Sichuan earthquake. It was one of the largest and most ambitious charity events ever assembled in the territory.

Personal life 
In 2008, Lau married Malaysian Chinese Carol Chu after 24 years of speculation over their relationship. Both are vegetarian and devout Buddhists. The couple married in Las Vegas. On 9 May 2012, Chu gave birth to their first child, a daughter, Hanna. In January 2017, Lau was seriously injured after being thrown off and stomped by a horse during a commercial shoot in Khao Lak, an area three hours outside of Thailand's capital city, Bangkok. However, Lau was able to fully return to work in August 2017, stating he has recovered 95 per cent from his injuries and has fully recovered by the end of the year.

Awards and nominations

Honors 
Lau was noted for his highly positive energy, his hard work and active involvement in charity works throughout his 30 years in showbiz and honoured as a "Justice of Peace" by the Hong Kong SAR government in 2008. In May 2010, he received the "World Outstanding Chinese" award and an "honorary doctorate" from the University of New Brunswick, Canada. On 14 December 2017, Lau was awarded a Doctor of Letters degree from the Hong Kong Shue Yan University, with the citation highlighting his popularity among locals which stated: "His low-key, modest, friendly and approachable personality has endeared him to millions of fans and ordinary folks alike, who also consider him to be a 'heartthrob' and the 'unofficial Chief Executive of Hong Kong'".

In 2018, asteroid 55381 Lautakwah, discovered by Bill Yeung at the Desert Eagle Observatory in 2001, was named for Lau. The official naming citation was published by the Minor Planet Center on 11 July 2018.

See also 
Andy Lau filmography

Awards and achievements 
 
|-
! colspan="3" style="background: #DAA520;" | Jade Solid Gold Best Ten Music Awards Presentation
|-

|-
! colspan="3" style="background: #DAA520;" | Hong Kong Film Awards

|-
! colspan="3" style="background: #DAA520;" | Ming Pao Power Academy Awards
|-

References

External links 

Andy Lau Official Website  
Andy Lau Official Dou Yin 

1961 births
Living people
20th-century Hong Kong male actors
20th-century Hong Kong male singers
21st-century Hong Kong male actors
21st-century Hong Kong male singers
Cantopop singers
Converts to Buddhism
Hong Kong Buddhists
Hong Kong film presenters
Hong Kong film producers
Hong Kong idols
Hong Kong male film actors
Hong Kong male singers
Hong Kong male television actors
Hong Kong Mandopop singers
Hong Kong philanthropists
Recipients of the Bronze Bauhinia Star
TVB veteran actors
World record holders